Stevia is a natural sweetener and sugar substitute derived from the leaves of the plant species Stevia rebaudiana, native to Paraguay and Brazil.

The active compounds are steviol glycosides (mainly stevioside and rebaudioside), which have about 50 to 300 times the sweetness of sugar, are heat-stable, pH-stable, and not fermentable. The human body does not metabolize the glycosides in stevia, so it contains zero calories as a non-nutritive sweetener. Stevia's taste has a slower onset and longer duration than that of sugar, and at high concentrations some of its extracts may have an aftertaste described as licorice-like or bitter. Stevia is used in sugar- and calorie-reduced food and beverage products as an alternative for variants with sugar.

The legal status of stevia as a food additive or dietary supplement varies from country to country. In the United States, certain high-purity stevia glycoside extracts have been generally recognized as safe (GRAS) and may be lawfully marketed and added to food products, but stevia leaf and crude extracts do not have GRAS or Food and Drug Administration (FDA) approval for use in food. The European Union approved Stevia rebaudiana additives in 2011, while in Japan, stevia has been widely used as a sweetener for decades.

The plant Stevia rebaudiana has been used for more than 1,500 years by the Guaraní peoples of South America, who called it ka'a he'ê ("sweet herb"). The leaves have been used traditionally for hundreds of years in both Paraguay and Brazil to sweeten local teas and medicines, and as a "sweet treat". The genus was named for the Spanish botanist and physician Pedro Jaime Esteve (Petrus Jacobus Stevus, 1500–1556) a professor of botany at the University of Valencia.

In 1899, Swiss botanist Moisés Santiago Bertoni, while conducting research in eastern Paraguay, first described the plant and the sweet taste in detail. Only limited research was conducted on the topic until, in 1931, two French chemists isolated the glycosides that give stevia its sweet taste.

Early regulation 
During the 1990s, the United States Food and Drug Administration (FDA) received two petitions requesting that stevia be classified as generally recognized as safe (GRAS), but the FDA "disagreed with [the] conclusions [detailed in the petitions]". Stevia remained banned for all uses until the Dietary Supplement Health and Education Act of 1994, after which the FDA revised its stance and permitted stevia to be used as a dietary supplement, although still not as a food additive. In 1999, prompted by early studies, the European Commission banned stevia's use in food products within the European Union pending further research. In 2006 and 2016, research data compiled in the safety evaluations released by the World Health Organization found no adverse effects.

In December 2008, the FDA gave a "no objection" approval for GRAS status to Truvia and PureVia, both of which use  derived from the Stevia rebaudiana plant. However, the FDA said that these products are not stevia, but a highly purified Stevia rebaudiana-extract product. In 2015, the FDA still regarded stevia as "not an approved food additive", and stated that it "has not been affirmed as GRAS in the United States due to inadequate toxicological information". In June 2016, the U.S. Customs and Border Protection issued an order of detention for stevia products made in China based on information that the products were made using prison labor. Certain high-purity stevia glycoside extracts have been generally recognized as safe (GRAS) and may be lawfully marketed and added to food products.

Commercial use 
In the early 1970s, sweeteners such as cyclamate and saccharin were gradually decreased or removed from a variant formulation of Coca-Cola. Consequently, use of stevia as an alternative began in Japan, with the aqueous extract of the leaves yielding purified steviosides developed as sweeteners. The first commercial Stevia sweetener in Japan was produced by the Japanese firm Morita Kagaku Kogyo Co., Ltd. in 1971. The Japanese have been using stevia in food products and soft drinks, (including Coca-Cola), and for table use. In 2006, Japan consumed more stevia than any other country, with stevia accounting for 40% of the sweetener market.

In the mid-1980s, stevia became popular in U.S. natural foods and health food industries, as a noncaloric natural sweetener for teas and weight-loss blends. The makers of the synthetic sweetener NutraSweet (at the time Monsanto) asked the FDA to require testing of the herb. 
As of 2006, China was the world's largest exporter of stevioside products. In 2007, the Coca-Cola Company announced plans to obtain approval for its Stevia-derived sweetener, Rebiana, for use as a food additive within the United States by 2009, as well as plans to market Rebiana-sweetened products in 12 countries that allow stevia's use as a food additive.

In May 2008, Coca-Cola and Cargill announced the availability of Truvia, a consumer-brand Stevia sweetener containing erythritol and Rebiana, which the FDA permitted as a food additive in December 2008. Coca-Cola announced intentions to release stevia-sweetened beverages in late December 2008. From 2013 onwards, Coca-Cola Life, containing stevia as a sweetener, was launched in various countries around the world.

Shortly afterward, PepsiCo and Pure Circle announced PureVia, their brand of Stevia-based sweetener, but withheld release of beverages sweetened with  until receipt of FDA confirmation. Since the FDA permitted Truvia and PureVia, both the Coca-Cola Company and PepsiCo have introduced products that contain their new sweeteners.

Industrial extracts
Rebaudioside A has the least bitterness of all the steviol glycosides in the Stevia rebaudiana plant. To produce steviol glycosides commercially, Stevia rebaudiana plants are dried and subjected to a hot water extraction process. This crude extract contains about 50% rebaudioside A. The various glycosides are separated and purified via crystallization techniques, typically using ethanol or methanol as solvent. The dried extract contains no less than 95% steviol glycosides.

Stevia rebaudiana extracts and derivatives are produced industrially and marketed under different trade names.
 Rebiana is an abbreviated name for the Stevia extract, .
 Truvia is the brand for an erythritol and rebiana sweetener concoction manufactured by Cargill and developed jointly with the Coca-Cola Company.
 PureVia is PepsiCo's brand of rebiana.
 EverSweet, discovered and developed by Evolva, and manufactured jointly by Cargill and DSM.

Mechanism of action

Glycosides are molecules that contain glucose residues bound to other non-sugar substances called aglycones (molecules with other sugars are polysaccharides). Preliminary experiments deduce that the tongue's taste receptors react to the glycosides and transduce the sweet taste sensation and the lingering bitter aftertaste by direct activation of sweet and bitter receptors.

According to basic research, steviol glycosides and steviol interact with a protein channel called TRPM5, potentiating the signal from the sweet or bitter receptors, amplifying the taste of other sweet, bitter and umami tastants. The synergetic effect of the glycosides on the sweet receptor and TRPM5 explains the sweetness sensation. Some steviol glycosides (rebaudioside A) are perceived sweeter than others (stevioside).

Steviol is processed by intestinal microflora and is also taken up into the bloodstream, further metabolised by the liver to steviol glucuronide and several other metabolites, and excreted in the urine.

A three-dimensional map of the proteins produced by the stevia plant, showing the crystalline structures that produce both the sensation of sweetness and bitter aftertaste in the sweetener, was reported in 2019.

Safety and regulations
A 2010 review found that the use of Stevia rebaudiana sweeteners as replacements for sugar might benefit children, people with diabetes, and those wishing to lower their intake of calories.

Although both steviol and rebaudioside A have been found to be mutagenic in laboratory in vitro testing, these effects have not been demonstrated for the doses and routes of administration to which humans are exposed. Two 2010 review studies found no health concerns with Stevia rebaudiana or its sweetening extracts.

Used as an extract, stevia leaves have been used traditionally in Paraguay as a contraceptive.

The WHO's Joint Experts Committee on Food Additives has approved, based on long-term studies, an acceptable daily intake of steviol glycoside of up to 4 mg/kg of body weight. In 2010, The European Food Safety Authority established an acceptable daily intake of 4 mg/kg/day of steviol, in the form of steviol glycosides. Meanwhile, the Memorial Sloan Kettering Cancer Center warns that "steviol at high dosages may have weak mutagenic activity," and a review "conducted for" the Center for Science in the Public Interest notes that there are no published carcinogenicity results for rebaudioside A (or stevioside).

In August 2019, the US FDA placed an import alert on Stevia leaves and crude extracts – which do not have GRAS status – and on foods or dietary supplements containing them due to concerns about safety and potential for toxicity.

Availability and legal status by country or area
The plant may be grown legally in most countries, although some countries restrict its use as a sweetener. The legally allowed uses and maximum dosage of the extracts and derived products vary widely from country to country.
 Argentina: available as of 2008, regulatory status uncertain
 Australia:
 All steviol glycoside extracts were approved in 2008.
 Brazil: stevioside extract approved as food additive since 2005.
 Canada (as of November 2012)
 Steviol glycosides became available as a food additive on 30 November 2012.
 Stevia rebaudiana leaf and extracts are available as dietary supplements.
 Chile: available as of 2008, regulatory status uncertain
 China: available since 1984, regulatory status uncertain
 Colombia: available as of 2008, regulatory status uncertain
 European Union:  Steviol glycosides were approved and regulated as food additives by the European Commission on 11 November 2011.
 Hong Kong: steviol glycosides approved as food additives since January 2010
 India: In a notification dated 13 November 2015, FSSAI has permitted its use in a range of products. This includes carbonated water, dairy-based desserts and flavoured drinks, yoghurts, ready-to-eat cereals, fruit nectars and jams.
 Indonesia: (2012)
 Steviol glycosides are available as food additives since 2012.
 Stevia leaf is available as a dietary supplement.
 Israel: approved as food additive since January 2012.
 Japan: widely available since the 1970s and regulated as an existing additive since 1995.
 Korea: available as of 2008, regulatory status uncertain.
 Malaysia: available as of 2008, regulatory status uncertain.
 Mexico: mixed steviol glycoside extract (not separate extracts) approved since 2009.
 New Zealand:
 All steviol glycoside extracts were approved in 2008.
 Norway:
 Steviol glycoside approved as food additive (E 960) since June 2012.
 The plant itself has not been approved as of September 2012.
 Paraguay: available as of 2008, regulatory status uncertain.
 Peru: available as of 2008, regulatory status uncertain.
 Philippines: available as of 2008, regulatory status uncertain.
 Russian Federation: stevioside approved as food additive since 2008, in the "minimal dosage required" to achieve the goal.
 Saudi Arabia: available as of 2008, regulatory status uncertain.
 Singapore: steviol glycosides approved as food additive in certain foods, since 2005 Previously it was banned.
 South Africa: approved since September 2012 and widely available.
 Taiwan: available as of 2008, regulatory status uncertain.
 Thailand: available as of 2008, regulatory status uncertain.
 Turkey: available as of 2008, regulatory status uncertain.
 United Arab Emirates: available as of 2008, regulatory status uncertain.
 Uruguay: available as of 2008, regulatory status uncertain.
 United States (as of April 2017):
 Purified rebaudioside A has been allowed since December 2008 as a food additive (sweetener), sold under various trade names, and classified as "generally recognized as safe" ("GRAS").
 Stevia rebaudiana leaf and crude extracts have been available as dietary supplements since 1995, but the 2008 FDA authorization does not extend to them, and they do not have GRAS status. In 2019, leaves and crude extracts were included in an FDA import alert with concerns about their safety for use in foods or supplements and potential for toxicity.
 Vietnam: available as of 2008, regulatory status uncertain.

See also
 Thaumatin, a natural sweetener, derived from an African fruit
 Miraculin, a substance that modifies the perception of sour foods into sweet

Footnotes

References

External links
 

Herbs
Sugar substitutes